Nondi Mahlasela (born 25 December 1991) is a Motswana footballer who plays as a forward for Prison and the Botswana women's national team.

See also
List of Botswana women's international footballers

References

1991 births
Living people
Botswana women's footballers
Women's association football forwards
Botswana women's international footballers